Russell's sign, named after British psychiatrist Gerald Russell, is a sign defined as calluses on the knuckles or back of the hand due to repeated self-induced vomiting over long periods of time.  The condition generally arises from the patient's knuckles making contact with the incisor teeth during the act of inducing the gag reflex at the back of the throat with their finger(s).

This type of scarring is considered one of the physical indicators of a mental illness, and Russell's sign is primarily found in patients with an eating disorder such as bulimia nervosa or anorexia nervosa.  However, it is not always a reliable indicator of an eating disorder; there are many more factors associated with it.

Bulimics who are capable of "handsfree purging", or the induction of vomiting by the willful opening of the esophageal sphincter in a manner similar to belching, while contracting the stomach muscles, do not have Russell's sign.

References

Eating disorders
Hand
Symptoms and signs of mental disorders